Pavoraja mosaica, commonly known as the mosaic skate, is a species of fish in the family Arhynchobatidae. It lives in depths ranging from 300 meters to 450 meters off the northeastern coast of Australia.

Pavoraja mosaica has only been studied from a few specimens; therefore, nothing is known about its population size or trends. Although it can be spotted in a bycatch, current levels of fishing in its range are unlikely to pose a significant threat.

References

Pavoraja
Fauna of Queensland
Taxa named by Peter R. Last
Taxa named by Stephen Mallick
Taxa named by Gordon K. Yearsley
Fish described in 2008